(), also known as Telz-Stone, is an strictly Orthodox town in the Jerusalem District of Israel. It is located in the approximate area of an ancient place mentioned in the Bible, from which it takes its name.

Geography

Biblical connection

Kiriath-Jearim in the Hebrew Bible
From here the Ark was taken to Jerusalem by King David.

History
Six hundred dunams of modern-day  were purchased before 1948 by Menashe Elissar, a businessman who was attracted to the site as the location of the biblical .

The modern community was established in 1973 by a group of students and teachers from Yeshivat Telz in America. Despite the official name of "Kiryat Yearim", it is widely known as Telz-Stone, after the yeshiva and American Greetings founder-chairman Irving I. Stone, who helped to finance the community's early development.

Demography
According to the Israel Central Bureau of Statistics (CBS), at the end of 2019  had a population of 6,309, predominantly Jewish, with a growth rate of ?%. Many of the residents are immigrants from North America, Europe and South Africa.

Institutions
 is home to three Orthodox post-high school yeshivas aimed at foreign students, particularly from the U.S.: Neveh Zion, Keser Dovid and Yishrei Lev.

It is also home to a Sephardic Haredi yeshiva - Be'er Yitzhak and another yeshiva: Me'orot Hatorah.

References

Local councils in Jerusalem District
Populated places established in 1973